Sde Ya'akov (lit. Ya'akov Field) is a religious moshav in northern Israel. Located near Kiryat Tiv'on, it falls under the jurisdiction of Jezreel Valley Regional Council.

History
Sde Ya'akov was established in 1927, largely from pioneers who had settled in Sheikh Abreik after its purchase by the Jewish Agency. It was the first settlement founded by Hapoel HaMizrachi and was named for Yitzchak Yaacov Reines, founder of the Mizrachi movement.

References

External links
 The official website of Sde Yaakov  
 Sde Yaakov at the Galilee Development Authority website  
Moshav Sde Ya'akov Collection (in Hebrew) on the Digital collections of Younes and Soraya Nazarian Library, University of Haifa

Moshavim
Religious Israeli communities
Populated places established in 1927
Populated places in Northern District (Israel)
1927 establishments in Mandatory Palestine